Sports in Atlanta has a rich history, including the oldest on-campus NCAA Division I football stadium, Bobby Dodd Stadium, built in 1913 by the students of Georgia Tech. Atlanta also played host to the second intercollegiate football game in the South, played between the A&M College of Alabama (now Auburn University) and the University of Georgia in Piedmont Park in 1892; this game is now called the Deep South's Oldest Rivalry. The city hosts college football's annual Chick-fil-A Peach Bowl and the Peachtree Road Race, the world's largest 10 km race. Atlanta was the host city for the Centennial 1996 Summer Olympics, and Downtown Atlanta's Centennial Olympic Park was built for and commemorates the games.

Atlanta is home to professional franchises for five major team sports: the Atlanta Braves of Major League Baseball, the Atlanta Hawks of the National Basketball Association, the Atlanta Falcons of the National Football League, the Atlanta Dream of the Women's National Basketball Association, and Atlanta United FC of Major League Soccer. Atlanta also has top-level teams in the Georgia Swarm of the National Lacrosse League, Atlanta Rhinos in the North American Rugby League and Rugby ATL of Major League Rugby.

Atlanta was previously home to the Atlanta Flames (1972–1980) and the Atlanta Thrashers (1999–2011) of the National Hockey League . The Atlanta Gladiators are a professional minor league ice hockey team based in Duluth, Georgia. The Gladiators play in the South Division of the ECHL's Eastern Conference. There was also the Atlanta Blaze (2016-2019) of the now defunct Major League Lacrosse. (1999-2020)

Major league sports

Baseball
The Atlanta Braves baseball team has been Atlanta's Major League Baseball franchise since 1966. The team was founded in 1871 in Boston, Massachusetts as a National Association club, making it the oldest continuously operating sports franchise in North American sports. The club played 82 seasons in Boston (1871–1952) and used several nicknames, including Braves. The Braves moved to Milwaukee in 1953, and played as the Milwaukee Braves from 1953 to 1965. In Atlanta, the Braves won the 1995 World Series, and had an unprecedented run of 14 straight divisional championships from 1991 to 2005. They achieved their 4th overall title (2nd in Atlanta) after winning the 2021 World Series.

The Braves' Triple-A affiliate, the Gwinnett Stripers of the International League, has been based in the Gwinnett County suburb of Lawrenceville since 2009. Before the Braves moved to Atlanta, the Atlanta Crackers were Atlanta's professional baseball team from 1901 until their last season in 1965. They won 17 league championships in the minor leagues. The Atlanta Black Crackers (I) and Atlanta Black Crackers (II) were Atlanta's Negro league teams from 1919 until 1949.

American football
The Falcons have been Atlanta's National Football League franchise since 1966. The Falcons recently completed construction of a new retractable roof stadium, Mercedes Benz Stadium, playing their first pre-season game there on August 26, 2017. They have won the division title six times in two different divisions (NFC West and current NFC South), and two conference championships, going on to lose to the Denver Broncos in Super Bowl XXXIII (following the 1998 season) and the New England Patriots in Super Bowl LI (following the 2016 season). Super Bowl XXVIII, XXXIV, and LIII were hosted in Atlanta with the first two taking place in the now-demolished Georgia Dome.

The Alliance of American Football's Atlanta franchise, the Atlanta Legends, began play in 2019. They played at Georgia State Stadium, but the league's football operations were reportedly suspended and the team folded.

Basketball
The Atlanta Hawks of the National Basketball Association have played in Atlanta since the 1968–69 NBA season. The franchise began in 1946 as the Buffalo Bisons, briefly playing in Buffalo, New York, before moving to Moline, Illinois and becoming the Tri-Cities Blackhawks. The team moved to Milwaukee in 1951, then to St. Louis in 1955, where it won its sole NBA Championship (as the St. Louis Hawks). A decade after winning the NBA title, in 1968, the Hawks came to Atlanta. The Hawks have won six division titles and 18 playoff series since moving to Atlanta.

The Hawks' NBA G League affiliate, the College Park Skyhawks, is based in College Park (immediately southwest of Atlanta).

The Atlanta Dream are a 2008 expansion team in the Women's National Basketball Association. From their inception until the 2016 season, the Dream shared Philips Arena with their NBA counterpart; however, the Dream moved to McCamish Pavilion on the campus of Georgia Tech due to renovations of Philips Arena conflicting with the WNBA schedule during the 2017 and 2018 seasons.  After one more season in State Farm Arena (after the Philips was renamed during the renovations), they moved their home games to the new Gateway Center Arena for the 2020 season.

Soccer
Atlanta was selected in April 2014 for an expansion team to join Major League Soccer (MLS) and begin play in 2017. The team, operated by Falcons owner Arthur Blank (co-founder of The Home Depot), shares Mercedes-Benz Stadium with the Falcons and is named Atlanta United FC. Atlanta United won the MLS Cup in 2018. In 2018, Atlanta United launched its reserve team, Atlanta United 2, in the USL Championship.

The Atlanta Chiefs competed in the National Professional Soccer League (NPSL) in 1967 and the North American Soccer League (NASL) from 1968 to 1973 and again from 1979 to 1981. Founded in 1967 as a charter member of the NPSL, the club was the brainchild of Dick Cecil, then Vice President of the Atlanta Braves baseball franchise who was the Chiefs' owners. The Chiefs capped off the 1968 season by defeating the San Diego Toros in the NASL Final 1968 at Atlanta Stadium in front of approximately 15,000 spectators. In doing so, they became both the first champions of the NASL as well as the first major professional sports franchise in Atlanta to win a championship. For the 1973 season, the team played as the Atlanta Apollos.

The original Atlanta Beat of the Women's United Soccer Association (WUSA, 2001–2003) was the only team to reach the playoffs in each of the league's three seasons. The new Atlanta Beat made its debut in Women's Professional Soccer (WPS) in April 2010, and the following month played its first game in the new soccer-specific stadium that it shared with Kennesaw State University in the northern suburb of Kennesaw. WPS played its final season in 2011 and folded just before its scheduled 2012 season; the Beat folded along with the league and are not part of WPS' effective successor, the current National Women's Soccer League.

Atlanta was previously home to the Atlanta Silverbacks of the North American Soccer League and the Atlanta Silverbacks Women in the W-League. In 2007, the men's Silverbacks had their best season, advancing to the USL Finals against the Seattle Sounders. The women's Silverbacks won the league title in 2011. Both teams briefly ceased operations after the 2015 season, the men's team due to lack of ownership in the NASL and the women's team because the W-League ceased operations. New ownership came to the rescue prior to the 2016 seasons, as both have resurfaced in the NPSL and WPSL, respectively.

Ice hockey
In 1972, The OMNI became home to the Atlanta Flames of the National Hockey League. The Flames qualified for the playoffs six times in eight seasons, but failed to win a playoff series. In 1980, the team departed for Calgary, Alberta, where it currently plays as the Calgary Flames.

In 1999, the NHL returned to Atlanta in the form of the Expansion Atlanta Thrashers, which played in Philips Arena. The Thrashers won the Southeast Division in 2006–07, but were swept in their only playoff appearance. After eleven seasons in Atlanta, in 2011, the Thrashers moved to Winnipeg, Manitoba, and became the current Winnipeg Jets.

From 1992 to 1996, Atlanta was home to the short-lived Atlanta Knights, an International Hockey League team. Their inaugural season was excellent for a new team, and was only bested by their sophomore season in which they won the championship Turner Cup. In 1996, they moved to Quebec City, Quebec, and became the Quebec Rafales.

Since the Thrashers moved to Winnipeg, their former ECHL affiliate in Duluth, Georgia, the Atlanta Gladiators, became the area's only professional hockey team. The Gladiators moved to Gwinnett County in 2003 after seven seasons as the Mobile Mysticks, and has won three division championships, and a conference championship since 2006.

Box Lacrosse
In 2015, Atlanta became the furthest south major league box lacrosse team in the National Lacrosse League (NLL) when John Arlotta moved the Minnesota Swarm franchise from St. Paul, Minnesota, to Duluth, Georgia, and renamed the team to the Georgia Swarm.  In the four (full) seasons in the Atlanta market, they have made the playoffs each year, including winning the National Lacrosse League Cup in 2017.

Rugby union
Atlanta is home to many rugby union clubs. On September 21, 2018, Major League Rugby, the top-level rugby union league in North America, announced that Atlanta was one of the expansion teams joining the league for the 2020 season. The team name Rugby ATL was revealed on February 26, 2019.

Other rugby union teams include the Atlanta Harlequins, who ranked number two in the United States in Division 1 for women's clubs under USA Rugby, the governing body for rugby in the United States. From 2014 to 2016, the suburb of Kennesaw hosted the USA Women's Sevens, an event in the annual World Rugby Women's Sevens Series in the sevens version of the sport, but that event has since moved to Las Vegas.

Other teams

Field Lacrosse
In 2016, Atlanta fielded its first professional field Lacrosse team in Major League Lacrosse. The expansion franchise, Atlanta Blaze, took to the field at Kennesaw State University's Fifth Third Bank Stadium.  The team made its first MLL playoff appearance in the 2018 season. The Blaze later ceased operations in 2020.

Rugby league
Atlanta Rhinos, formerly of the USA Rugby League, now in the professional North American Rugby League represent the city at rugby league. The club was formerly linked with English Super League club the Leeds Rhinos.

Other sports
In the Arena Football League, the Georgia Force played in Philips Arena and Infinite Energy Arena in suburban Duluth since the franchise relocated from Nashville in 2002 until 2012.

The Atlanta Kookaburras are a successful Australian rules football club that compete in men's and women's divisions in the MAAFL and SEAFL and USAFL National Championships.

Atlanta is home to two of the nation's Gaelic football clubs, the Na Fianna and Clan na nGael Ladies' and Men's Gaelic Football Clubs. Both are members of the North American County Board, a branch of the Gaelic Athletic Association, the worldwide governing body of Gaelic games.

College sports
Atlanta has a rich tradition in collegiate athletics, with two NCAA Division I programs in the city and a third in the metropolitan area, as well as one NCAA Division 3 program.

Georgia Tech 

The Georgia Tech Yellow Jackets participate in 17 intercollegiate sports, including football and basketball. Tech competes in the Atlantic Coast Conference, and is home to Bobby Dodd Stadium, the oldest continuously used on campus site for college football in the southern United States, and oldest currently in Division I FBS. The stadium was built in 1913 by students of Georgia Tech.

Georgia State 
The Georgia State Panthers, representing Georgia State University, field varsity teams in 16 sports, also including football and basketball. GSU, like Georgia Tech located within Atlanta proper, is currently in its second stint as a member of the Sun Belt Conference. It had been a charter member of the league in 1976, but left in 1981. In 2013, GSU returned to the Sun Belt from the Colonial Athletic Association. The Panthers play football at Center Parc Stadium, which was originally built as Centennial Olympic Stadium for the 1996 Olympics before being converted to Turner Field, a baseball stadium for the Atlanta Braves.

Kennesaw State 
The Kennesaw State Owls, based in the northern suburb of Kennesaw, represent Kennesaw State University in 17 varsity sports in the ASUN Conference (ASUN). KSU did not start a football program until 2015. Since the ASUN did not sponsor football at the time, the KSU football team joined the Big South Conference. For the 2022–23 academic year, the ASUN became an FCS football-sponsoring conference, and Kennesaw State moved its football membership to the ASUN. In October 2022, Kennesaw State accepted an invitation to join the Conference USA, which includes transitioning the football team to the Football Bowl Subdivision, effective in July 2024.

Emory University 
Atlanta is also home to the Emory University Eagles, an NCAA Division 3 athletic powerhouse nestled in the Druid Hills neighborhood. Competing in the University Athletic Association conference and boasting 31 NCAA Division 3 National Championships, the leaders of this program include Men's and Women's Swimming and Diving with 14 national championships, Men's and Women's Tennis with 14 national championships, Women's Volleyball with 2 national championships, and Women's Golf with 1 national championship. Notable alumni include Andrew Wilson, a 2021 Olympian for Team USA, and gold medalist in the 4x100-meter medley relay.

Tournaments and events

Running races
Giving itself the nickname "Running City USA", Atlanta hosts several popular road running events. The annual Peachtree Road Race is the world's largest  race. Other annual races include the Atlanta Marathon and the Thanksgiving Day Half Marathon.

Tournaments hosted
Atlanta was the host city for the Centennial 1996 Summer Olympics and has hosted Super Bowl XXVIII (1994), Super Bowl XXXIV (2000), and Super Bowl LIII (2019). Atlanta has also hosted the NCAA Final Four Men's Basketball Championship, most recently in 2013. The city hosts college football's annual Chick-fil-A Bowl (Formerly known as the Peach Bowl). Atlanta hosted the NCAA Final Four Men's Basketball Championship in April 2002, April 2007, and April 2013. Atlanta will be one of the eleven US host cities for the 2026 FIFA World Cup.

Other events
Racing facilities include Atlanta Motor Speedway, a 1.5 mile (2.4 km) NASCAR race track in Hampton, and Road Atlanta in Braselton. In 2005 Atlanta competed with other major U.S. cities for the NASCAR Hall of Fame. In March 2006, Atlanta lost to Charlotte, North Carolina.

In golf, the final PGA Tour event of the season, The Tour Championship, is played annually at East Lake Golf Club. This golf course is used because of its connection to the great amateur golfer Bobby Jones, an Atlanta native.

Atlanta also was the home to the now-defunct World Championship Wrestling hosted two Starcade events, held each Thanksgiving night, by WCW. Atlanta also hosted WrestleMania XXVII in the Georgia Dome on April 3, 2011.

References